Ulsrud is a station on the Østensjø Line (Line 3) on the Oslo Metro, located between the stations of Oppsal and Bøler,  from Stortinget. The station was opened as a subway station 29 October 1967. P.A.M. Mellbye was the station's architect.

References

External links

Oslo Metro stations in Oslo
Railway stations opened in 1967
1967 establishments in Norway